Radolišta is a village in the municipality of Struga, North Macedonia.

Geography
This village is located in the southwest of Struga Municipality, at the foot of the Jabllanicë mountain range.

History
Human settlement in Radolišta has a long history that dates back to late antiquity: 
- Traces of old structural foundations located in the eastern part of the village
- Paleochristian Basilica (locally called "Bazilika") - built in the 6th century
- Necropolis (7th-8th centuries)

Basilica and Necropolis
The Paleochristian Basilica belonged to the Illyrian Dassareti tribe, which inhabited this region since antiquity. The Bazilika lies on the southern side of Ladorisht, in an area called 'Livadhet e Dautit' (Daut's Meadows). Excavations began under Dimçe Koço in 1954, and were finished in 1976 by the archaeologist Vlado Malenko. As a result of these excavations, graves from the early Middle Ages were also discovered. The Bazilika consists of a narthex, exonarthex, annex and intersection. Of particular note are the Narthex and the central ship which are covered by floors and mosaics stylized with flora and geometric decorations, as well as landscapes of living birds. The Bazilika dates between the end of the 4th century and the beginning of the 5th century, whereas the graves date between the 7th-8th centuries. The findings within this necropolis have similarity and connectivity with the Komani-Kruja culture, which is hypothesised to be the link between the ancestral population of the Albanians and the medieval Albanians.

Demographics
The village of Radolišta is inhabited by Tosks, a subgroup of southern Albanians and speak the Tosk Albanian dialect. Radolišta is one of the largest villages in the region of Struga with more than 800 houses.

As of the 2021 census, Radolišta had 2,067 residents with the following ethnic composition:
Albanians 1,954
Persons for whom data are taken from administrative sources 112
Macedonians 1

According to the 2002 census, the village had a total of 3,119 inhabitants.

Culture
In village cultural life is organized and sports activities through the football club 'Flamurtari (progress) and SHKA Valët e Liqenit (Lake waves) are represented in as many festivals as well as being honoured with the outside of many awards and praise. Radolišta is also rooted in cultural heritage as Ura e gurit OPALE'' (Stone bridge OPALE).

Sports
The local football club KF Flamurtari Ladorisht plays in the Macedonian Third Football League.

Gallery

References

External links
Ladorishti.org - Community website 

Villages in Struga Municipality
Albanian communities in North Macedonia
Illyrian North Macedonia